E-Z Moving is a moving company located at Salt Lake City known for taking on outsourced relocation hassles such as moving furniture, appliances etc.

Operations
The company focuses on moving people and their cargo, including delivery of items in specific rooms at new locations, in and out of state.

The company uses 24 ft and 26 ft trucks equipped with moving blankets, dollies, bungee cords, rubber bands, straps and tool for disassembling and assembling furniture and appliances to cater for their commercial and residential moving services.

The company also works on fully outsourced tasks such as moving a complete office and setting it up at a new location over the days.

References

Transportation companies of the United States
Transportation companies based in Utah